The grey partridge (Perdix perdix), also known as the gray-legged partridge, English partridge, Hungarian partridge, or hun, is a gamebird in the pheasant family Phasianidae of the order Galliformes, gallinaceous birds. The scientific name is the Latin for "partridge", and is itself derived from Ancient Greek  perdix.

Description

The grey partridge is a rotund bird, brown-backed, with grey flanks and chest. The belly is white, usually marked with a large chestnut-brown horse-shoe mark in males, and also in many females. Hens lay up to twenty eggs in a ground nest. The nest is usually in the margin of a cereal field, most commonly winter wheat.

Measurements:

 Length: 
 Weight: 
 Wingspan: 

The only major and constant difference between the sexes is the so-called cross of Lorraine on the tertiary coverts of females—these being marked with two transverse bars, as opposed to the one in males. These are present after around 16 weeks of age when the birds have moulted into adult plumage. Young grey partridges are mostly yellow-brown and lack the distinctive face and underpart markings. The song is a harsh, high-pitched kieerr-ik, and when disturbed, like most of the gamebirds, it flies a short distance on rounded wings, often calling rick rick rick as it rises.

They are a seed-eating species, but the young in particular take insects as an essential protein supply. During the first 10 days of life, the young can only digest insects. The parents lead their chicks to the edges of cereal fields, where they can forage for insects.

Distribution
Widespread and common throughout much of its range, the grey partridge is evaluated as "of Least Concern" on the IUCN Red List of Threatened Species. However, it has suffered a serious decline in the UK, and in 2015 appeared on the "Birds of Conservation Concern" Red List. This partridge breeds on farmland across most of Europe and across the western Palearctic as far as southwestern Siberia and has been introduced widely into Canada, United States, South Africa, Australia and New Zealand. A popular gamebird in vast areas of North America, it is commonly known as "Hungarian partridge" or just "hun". They are also a non-migratory terrestrial species, and form flocks in numbers of up to 30 outside of the breeding season.

Status and conservation
Though common and not threatened, it appears to be declining in numbers in some areas of intensive cultivation such as the United Kingdom, probably due to a loss of breeding habitat and insecticides harming insect numbers, an important food source for the species. Their numbers have fallen in these areas by as much as 85% in the last 25 years. Efforts are being made in the United Kingdom by organizations such as the Game & Wildlife Conservation Trust to halt this decline by creating conservation headlands.

In 1995, it was nominated a Biodiversity action plan (BAP) species. In Ireland, it is now virtually confined to the Lough Boora reserve in County Offaly where a recent conservation project has succeeded in boosting its numbers to around 900, raising hopes that it may be reintroduced to the rest of Ireland.

Subspecies
There are eight recognized subspecies:
 P. p. armoricana (Hartert, 1917) – found locally in France

 P. p. canescens (Burturlin, 1906) – southern grey partridge, found from Turkey east to the South Caucasus and northwest Iran

 P. p. hispaniensis (Reichenow, 1892): Iberian partridge, found from central Pyrenees to northeast Portugal

 P. p. italica (Hartert, 1917) – Italian grey partridge, supposedly extinct, now reintroduced

 P. p. lucida (Altum, 1894) – eastern grey partridge, found from Finland east to Ural Mountains and south to Black Sea and northern Caucasus

 P. p. perdix (Linnaeus, 1758) – nominate, found in the British Isles and southern Scandinavia to Italy and the Balkans

 P. p. robusta (Homeyer and Tancré, 1883) – southeastern grey partridge, found from the Ural Mountains to southwestern Siberia and northwestern China

 P. p. sphagnetorum (Altum, 1894) – found in the moors of the northern part of the Netherlands and northwest Germany

References

External links

 
 Game & Wildlife Conservation Trust - Grey Partridge
 
 Gray Partridge Species Account – Cornell Lab of Ornithology
 Ageing and sexing (PDF; 2.6 MB) by Javier Blasco-Zumeta & Gerd-Michael Heinze
 Feathers of Grey partridge (Perdix perdix) 

Game birds
grey partridge
Birds described in 1758
Birds of Europe
Birds of Central Asia
Birds of North America
grey partridge
Taxa named by Carl Linnaeus